Collonia granulosa is a species of small sea snail with calcareous opercula, a marine gastropod mollusk in the family Colloniidae.

Distribution
This marine species occurs in Indo-Malaysia and Oceania.

References

External links
 To Biodiversity Heritage Library (5 publications)
 To World Register of Marine Species
 

Colloniidae
Gastropods described in 1868